Jennifer Ashley Hirsh Melvin (born June 25, 1986), known professionally as Monogem (stylized in all caps), is a Mexican-American singer and songwriter. Before starting her music career as Monogem, she appeared on season eleven of American Idol as a contestant where she placed fifteenth. She released her debut Spanish language album, Gardenia (2021).

In 2015, she released her self-titled debut extended play, Monogem. She later released her second extended play, 100% (2017). Two years later, she released her third extended play, So Many Ways (2019).

Early life and education 
Jennifer Ashley Hirsh was born and raised in Agoura Hills, California. She is of Mexican and Jewish descent, with her family coming from Guadalajara, Mexico. She graduated from Berklee College of Music where she studied Brazilian music.

Musical career

2012–2015: American Idol & Monogem 

In 2012, Hirsh auditioned for the eleventh season of American Idol in Houston, Texas. In the semi-final round, she performed Adele's "One and Only", but was not one of the five highest female vote-getters. The judges selected her to be in the Wild Card round, and she performed "Oh! Darling" by The Beatles. Eventually, she was eliminated and did not advance to the Top 13, which she ended up in the Top 24 (placed in the Top 15).

After American Idol, Hirsh began her music career under the name of the Monogem Ring, which is a leftover glow from one of the exploded supernova stars.

In 2013, Monogem released her debut single called, "Follow You". In 2014, she released two more singles named: "Wait and See" and "Stay With Me". A year later, she released a single called "The Glow" on January 20, 2015. They were included in Monogem's self-titled debut EP, Monogem, on February 3, 2015. A music video for "Wait and See" was released on August 6, 2015, directed by Michael Guilfoil. On October 9, 2015, Monogem released another single named: "Gone".

2016–2020: 100% & So Many Ways 

On April 22, 2016, a single named "Take It Slow" was released. A year later (in 2017), a single called "Wild" was released. On March 29, 2017, a music video for "Wild" was released, starring Matthew RC Taylor and Coco Arquette. On April 25, 2017, another single called "100%" was released by Monogem. The four singles from October 2015 to April 2017, were included in Monogem’s sophomore EP called, 100%, which was released on May 19, 2017.

After two years, three singles were released in 2019. The first single was from 2019 and is called, "Lean" which was released on May 15, 2019. On June 28, 2019, "So Many Ways" was released by Monogem, with a music video. And "Soy Lo Que Soy" was released on September 19, 2019. In the same year, a third EP named, So Many Ways was released on October 18, 2019.

In 2020, Monogem released two singles for her upcoming debut album. "Paraíso" got released on May 29, 2020. The second single, "Bésame Mucho" was released on November 20, 2020.

2021–present: Gardenia 

On May 20, 2021, Monogem returned with another single named, "Sólo Amor" with a lyric video. On July 15, the second single for 2021 was released named "Dame La Fuerza", joined with a music video. "Magia", the lead single for Monogem’s debut album, was released on August 26. Following the release of her single "Magia", Hirsh revealed in the accompanying visual video that she was expecting her first child with her husband, Jason Melvin.

Hirsh released her debut album named, Gardenia on September 2, 2021. The debut album also included one of the tracks of So Many Ways EP, "Soy Lo Que Soy". Gardenia was named in honor of Hirsh's grandmother, Hortensia, whose favorite flower was the gardenia.Hirsh made an announcement throughout on her social media, that she gave birth to her son on September 2021. 

Monogem is currently working on a reimagined version of her debut album.

Discography

Studio album

Extended plays

Singles

As a featured artist

Guest appearances

Music videos

Filmography

Television

References 

Living people
1986 births
American musicians of Mexican descent
Hispanic and Latino American women singers
American Latin pop singers
Spanish-language singers of the United States
Women in Latin music
American women songwriters
American women pop singers
21st-century American women singers
21st-century American singers
Berklee College of Music alumni
Songwriters from California
Singers from Los Angeles